Lake Hemet is a water storage reservoir located in the San Jacinto Mountains in Mountain Center, Riverside County, California, with a capacity of  of water.  It was created in 1895 with the construction of Lake Hemet Dam. Originally built by a private company, today it is owned and operated by the Lake Hemet Municipal Water District (LHMWD).

Facts and statistics 

Lake Hemet is an artificial lake in the San Jacinto Mountains, 4,340 ft (1,323 m) above sea level. Lake Hemet is part of the San Bernardino National Forest. Fishing is the primary attraction to the lake, which is stocked with rainbow trout, channel catfish, bluegill and largemouth bass. Other Lake Hemet activities include boating, picnicking, hiking, and camping in the surrounding areas.

LHMWD's customers are represented by a publicly elected board of five directors in 5 divisions. They represent approximately 13,800 domestic and 51 agricultural customers within a 26-square mile (67 km²) service area.

Service connections
 1,800 in 1955
 1,873 in 1957
 2,623 in 1962
 3,747 in 1967
 5,000 in 1972
 6,850 in 1977
 13,636 in 2003
 13,960 in 2004

Length of Lake Hemet Municipal Water District Pipeline
 30.8 miles (49.6 km) in 1957
 53.59 miles (86.7 km) in 1962
 78.29 miles (127.6 km) in 1967
 96.82 miles (155.8 km) in 1972
 127 miles (204 km) in 1977
 136 miles (219 km) in 2003
 139 miles (224 km) in 2004

It is 13 miles (23 km) SW of Palm Springs, California, United States.

History 

Development of the San Jacinto Valley can be traced to 1887, with the formation of the Lake Hemet Water Company and the Hemet Land Company by Edward L. Mayberry, his wealthy San Francisco friend, William F. Whittier, and their partners. These two companies allowed the partnership to acquire land and water rights from the San Jacinto Valley to the west end of Garner Valley in the San Jacinto Mountains.

Lake Hemet Water Company placed the first stone of the Lake Hemet Dam on January 6, 1891.

The 1932 opening of the Pines to Palms Highway (SR 74) from the coast to Palm Desert was significant in developing Lake Hemet for increased recreational uses.

LHMWD was founded on September 27, 1955, to take over the activities of the Lake Hemet Water Company, purchasing the Lake Hemet water system with funds raised through a bond initiative.

Appearances in popular culture

Shots of the lake were used in the 1980s CBS television show Airwolf, in which recurring character Stringfellow Hawke lived in a cabin on the lake.

The lake was featured in Visiting... with Huell Howser Episode 923.

See also
 List of lakes in California

References

 Lake Hemet Municipal Water District

External links
 

Hemet, Lake
Hemet, California
Dams in California
San Jacinto River (California)
United States local public utility dams
Hemet, Lake
Hemet